Peter Druschel (born 22 April 1959 in Bad Reichenhall) is a German computer scientist and founding director of the Max Planck Institute for Software Systems in Saarbrücken.

Education and career
Druschel studied electrical engineering specializing on data technology at the Munich University of Applied Sciences and completed his studies as a graduate engineer. He graduated in 1994 from the University of Arizona under Larry L. Peterson. In the same year he became Assistant Professor of Computer Science at Rice University. In 2000 he became Associate Professor, followed in 2002 by a full professorship.

In August 2005 he started his work at Saarbrücken's Max Planck Institute for Software Systems as the founding director. Druschel specializes in distributed systems such as peer-to-peer networks and security and operating systems. Along with Ant Rowstron, Druschel developed the Pastry technique at Microsoft. In 2008 Druschel was elected a member of the Leopoldina. In the same year he was accepted as a full member of the Academia Europaea.

References

External links

1959 births
Living people
German computer scientists
People from Bad Reichenhall
University of Arizona alumni
Rice University faculty
Max Planck Institute directors